Sick of Waiting Tables... is the third mixtape in Sage Francis' "Sick of" mixtape series.

Track listing

References

2004 compilation albums
Strange Famous Records compilation albums